Schernfeld is a municipality in the district of Eichstätt in Bavaria in Germany.

Mayor
Ludwig Mayinger is the mayor since 1996.

References

Eichstätt (district)